Anthony Tokpah (born July 26, 1977) is a retired Liberian football goalkeeper. He was also a member of the Liberia national football team.

Career
Anthony Tokpah, after playing with Ratanang Maholosiane and Manning Rangers in South Africa, came to Croatian First League club HNK Hajduk Split in 1995, along with another Liberian international, Mass Sarr, Jr. Beside the first season when he played 7 league matches, he did not get much chances to play while with Hajduk. In 2000, he moved to the United States where he played with Hershey Wildcats and Atlanta Silverbacks. In 2006, he moved to Guayabo, another soccer team in the United States.

National team
Tokpah made his international debut for Liberia in a 1996 African Cup of Nations qualifying match against Senegal on July 30, 1995.

References

External links 
 
 
 Stats from Croatia at HRrepka.

1973 births
Living people
Liberian footballers
Liberian expatriate footballers
Liberia international footballers
1996 African Cup of Nations players
Association football goalkeepers
HNK Hajduk Split players
HNK Trogir players
Croatian Football League players
Expatriate footballers in Croatia
Atlanta Silverbacks players
Hershey Wildcats players
Liberian expatriate sportspeople in the United States
Expatriate soccer players in the United States
Expatriate soccer players in South Africa
Manning Rangers F.C. players
Expatriate footballers in Brunei